Horizon is the debut album by German group Culture Beat. It was released on 8 March 1991 by Dance Pool. The album featured their first hit, "No Deeper Meaning", which reached No. 5 in the Netherlands.

Track listing
   "Horizon" - 9:10 
   "It's Too Late" - 6:04 
   "The Hyped Affect" - 6:00 
   "Tell Me That You Wait" - 4:19 
   "Black Flowers" - 5:46 
   "I Like You" - 3:59 
   "No Deeper Meaning" - 6:01 
   "Serious" - 5:16 
   "Der Erdbeermund" (Vocals - Jo Van Nelsen) - 4:05 
   "One Good Reason" - 5:10 
   "Tell Me That You Wait" (Airdrome Club Mix) - 8:28 
   "Horizon (Reprise)" - 5:27

Personnel

Culture Beat
 Jay Supreme
 Lana Earl
 Jens Zimmermann
 Torsten Fenslau
 Jürgen Katzmann

Additional musicians
 Didi Kociemba
 Hubert Nitsch
 Istvan Hartmann
 Luise Tielmann
 Nino
 Peter Braunholz

References

1991 debut albums
Culture Beat albums